Sorriso Esporte Clube, commonly known as Sorriso, is a Brazilian football club based in Sorriso, Mato Grosso state. They competed in the Copa do Brasil twice.

History
The club was founded on July 20, 1985. Sorriso Esporte Clube won the Campeonato Matogrossense in 1992 and in 1993. The club competed in the Copa do Brasil in 1993 and in 1994.

Achievements
Campeonato Matogrossense: 2
1992, 1993

Stadium
Sorriso Esporte Clube play their home games at Estádio Egídio José Preima. The stadium has a maximum capacity of 5,000 people.

References

Football clubs in Mato Grosso
Association football clubs established in 1985
1985 establishments in Brazil